Global Rescue provides medical, security, intelligence, and crisis response services to corporations, governments and individuals. Founded in partnership with Johns Hopkins Medicine, Global Rescue identifies, monitors and responds to potential threats. The company performs field rescues, sending critical care paramedics and military special forces veterans to the site of an emergency. Global Rescue provided services to its members during major events including the 2010 Haiti earthquake, the 2011 Arab Spring uprisings, the 2011 tsunami in Japan, the 2013 civil unrest in Egypt, and the April 2015 Nepal Earthquake

Organization 

Global Rescue is a membership organization offering individual and corporate memberships on a short-term or annual basis.  Global Rescue supports clients from its global operations centers and offices in Manila, Philippines; Islamabad, Pakistan; Amsterdam, Netherlands; Kyiv, Ukraine; Boston, Massachusetts, and Lebanon, New Hampshire. Clients include the American Alpine Club, the U.S. Ski Team and NASA, among others. Global Rescue conducts thousands of missions per year around the world, including helicopter evacuations from Mount Everest and other remote locations.

Global Rescue provides integrated travel risk crisis management to individuals, corporations and governments to help them meet their duty of care obligations, meaning that an organization must give employees information, resources, and accommodation to ensure their health, safety, and security.

History 

Global Rescue was founded in 2004 to address a lack of global emergency services for travelers and companies following 9/11. Among the global events for which Global Rescue has provided crisis response services are the 2006 Israeli conflict in Beirut, Lebanon; the 2008 terror attacks in Mumbai, India; the 2010 ash cloud in Western Europe; the 2012 coup attempt in Mali; and the 2015 earthquake in Nepal.

References 

Organizations established in 2004
Rescue aviation
Air ambulance services
Organizations based in Boston